Cheyenne Township is a township in Barton County, Kansas, United States.  As of the 2010 census, its population was 207.

Cheyenne Township was organized in 1878.

Geography
The unincorporated community of Redwing lies in the center of the township. According to the USGS, it contains one cemetery, Holy Family.

The Cheyenne Bottoms Wildlife Area is located almost exclusively in Cheyenne Township; it occupies most of the southern half of the township.  Blood Creek runs through some of the township's southern part, emptying into the lake at the center of Cheyenne Bottoms.

Two oil fields are located in Cheyenne Township: one in the northeast, and one in the west.

References

External links
 USGS Geographic Names Information System (GNIS)
 US-Counties.com
 City-Data.com

Townships in Barton County, Kansas
Townships in Kansas